Broadwater, Broad Water or Broadwaters may refer to:

Places

Australia
Electoral district of Broadwater, Queensland
Gold Coast Broadwater
Broadwater National Park
Broadwater, New South Wales
Broadwater, Queensland, a locality in the Southern Downs Region near Stanthorpe
Broadwater, Western Australia, a suburb of Busselton

United Kingdom

England
Broadwater Farm, Tottenham, London
Broadwater Farm riot, 1985 race riots 
Broadwater, West Sussex
Broadwater (electoral division), a West Sussex County Council constituency
Broadwater, Hertfordshire
The Broadwater, Berkshire. The name given to a small section of the River Blackwater, and the historical name of Twyford Brook, both tributaries of the River Loddon.
Broadwater School, Godalming
Broadwater Green, London
The Broad Water, an alternative name for Tixall Wide, Staffordshire
Broadwaters, ward in Wyre Forest, Worcestershire

Wales
Broad Water, a salt water lagoon in Gwynedd

United States
Broadwater Energy, a proposed liquid natural gas terminal proposed for Long Island Sound
Broadwater, Missouri
Broadwater County, Montana
Broadwater, Nebraska

People with the surname
Charles Arthur Broadwater (1840 - 1892), American businessman and banker
Chris Broadwater (born 1972), Louisiana politician
W. Craig Broadwater (1950 - 2006), a United States federal judge

Other uses
USS Broadwater (APA-139), US Navy ship
Broadwater Development, an American casino holding company

pt:Broadwater